Lötsjön is a small lake in Sundbyberg, a municipality north of Stockholm, Sweden. The shallow lake features a rich variety of water birds and a fountain. A promenade of approx. 1.4 km length leads around Lötsjön.

Swimming in the lake is prohibited.

The lake Råstasjön is located in close proximity to the east of Lötsjön.

Lakes of Stockholm County